Douglas F.C. was an English football club based in Kingswood, Bristol. They were the works team of the Douglas motorcycle factory, which later produced Vespa scooters under licence. The club was formed in 1903, and joined the Western Football League Division One in 1919–20, winning the title in their first season. However, they left the league soon after, and did not rejoin until the 1945–46 season. After finishing bottom of Division Two in 1949–50, they left the Western League. The club was affiliated to the Gloucestershire County FA.

The year after they left the Western League, they entered the FA Cup, but were beaten 5–0 at Clevedon in the Preliminary Round.

Douglas F.C. exists today in the form of Bendix F.C., members of the Bristol and District Football League.

References

1903 establishments in England
Western Football League
Defunct football clubs in Gloucestershire
Defunct football clubs in England
Works association football teams in England
Association football clubs established in 1903
Association football clubs disestablished in 1950